"Indo Smoke" is a single by Mista Grimm featuring Warren G and Nate Dogg from the Poetic Justice soundtrack. In addition to appearing on the  song was also produced by Warren G. "Indo Smoke" became Mista Grimm's only significant chart appearance during his brief career, making it to five different Billboard charts, peaking at #56 on the Billboard Hot 100.

Single track listing
"Indo Smoke" (Radio Edit)- 4:03  
"Indo Smoke" (LP Version)- 5:20  
"Indo Smoke" (Instrumental)- 5:25
Cameo appearance - Lil C- Style, Big C- Style, Dr.Dre, Kurupt, Daz, Snoop Dogg, 2Pac

Charts

References

1993 debut singles
Mista Grimm songs
Nate Dogg songs
Warren G songs
1993 songs
Songs written by Warren G
Epic Records singles
Songs about cannabis
Songs written by Nate Dogg